José  Alberto Quintanilla (born January 1, 1997) is an Olympic swimmer in the Men's 50 meters freestyle representing Bolivia. He competed in the 2016 Rio Olympics. José Quintanilla was a worldwide sensation when he cried of joy at the opening ceremony in the 2016 Olympics. He competed in the Men's 50 metre freestyle event where he ranked at #46 with a time of 23.35 seconds. He did not advance to the semifinals.

See also
Swimming at the 2016 Summer Olympics – Men's 50 metre freestyle

References

External links
José Quintanilla at Rio 2016

1997 births
Bolivian male swimmers
Living people
Sportspeople from Santa Cruz de la Sierra
Olympic swimmers of Bolivia
Swimmers at the 2016 Summer Olympics
Swimmers at the 2019 Pan American Games
Pan American Games competitors for Bolivia
21st-century Bolivian people